ABCD is a 2005 Indian Tamil-language romance film directed by Saravana Subbiah. The film starred Shaam, Nandana, Sneha, and Aparna.

Plot
Anand, an MBA-chartered accountant, runs in search of a job. He stays in the house of an old Brahmin whose daughter Chandra returns home following the death of her husband, who had been torturing her since their wedding. She slowly gets attracted towards Anand, for he shows love and affection towards her. Meanwhile, Anand comes across bharati in a bus, who misplaces his academic certificates. Bharati is a woman with revolutionary ideas and looks after her whole family. A sequence of events brings them close, leading to Bharati developing love towards him. Meanwhile, Anand comes across Divya Daisy, an orphan brought up by a church who goes to find a job herself and settles in life all out of her own efforts. Anand rescues her from an accident and rushes her to a hospital. Over a period of time, they become very close friends, eventually leading to Divya opening her heart to Anand. Who Anand decides to marry forms the rest of the story.

Cast

Sham as Anand
Nandana Kumar as Bharati
Sneha as Chandra
Aparna as Divya Daisy
Vadivelu as the bus conductor
Saravana Subbiah as Chandra's husband
Kundarthal Subbiah as Chandra's father
Madhan Bob as Anand's uncle
Kuyili as Chandra's mother
Aravind Akash as Christopher
Swetha Bharathi as Bharati's sister
Singamuthu as a bus passenger
Sriranjini as a church mother
Crane Manohar as a priest
Bonda Mani as a snake charmer

Production
Saravana Subbiah announced that his next film would be titled ABCDE, starring Shaam. The "E" stood for Eashwari, but the character was later removed and the title was shortened to ABCD. The letters stand for the main characters of the film. ABCD continues the trend of casting three heroines opposite the hero that started with Autograph and will continue with Vallavan. Shaam plays a mature man in the film.

Soundtrack
The soundtrack was composed by D. Imman.

Release and reception
The film released shortly after the successful . A critic from Sify wrote: "If you like a mixture of romance, mush and melodrama then ABCD is on your priority list". A critic from The Hindu opined that the film was "A love story decently told". A critic from Behindwoods wrote: "The film leaves you with a feeling of being overwhelmed by issues. The director attempts to tackle too many problems which was the mistake he did in his previous movie, Citizen. Yet, he must be congratulated for beating a different path in an industry which seems preoccupied with action and no melodrama". Malini Mannath of Chennai Online opined that "ABCD is a film that sincerely attempts to break away from the routine fare, simple, unpretentious and straight from the heart".

Accolades

References

External links

2005 films
2005 action drama films
2000s Tamil-language films
Indian action drama films